Nina Kuo  is a Chinese American painter, photographer, sculptor, author, video artist and activist who lives and works in New York City. Her work examines the role of women, feminism and identity in Asian-American art. Kuo has worked in partnership with the artist Lorin Roser.

Kuo grew up in Buffalo, New York, the daughter of abstract painter James K.Y. Kuo. She received a bachelor of science degree from SUNY Buffalo.

After moving to New York City, Kuo became part of the CETA-funded Cultural Council Foundation Artists Project. She worked in activist art communities such as Basement Workshop and as the first resident artist at the Asian American Arts Centre building registries through interviews and curation. Kuo was part of the Godzilla Asian American Arts Network. She went to China and met her grandmother who she photographed and referenced in later works. She exhibited at the Clocktower MOMA PS1 in a show against racial prejudice, and her mural Politeness in Poverty of 1988 was installed in the Broadway Lafayette subway station in New York City.

She was included by Marcia Tucker in the Bad Girls (art exhibition) at The New Museum in 1994. Her photo work was included by Lucy Lippard in The Lure of the Local: Senses of Place in a Multicentered Society following  a residency at Museum of Chinese in America.  In 1999 Kuo exhibited her Chi Pao (Chinese Banner Dresses) at the Center for Photography at Woodstock addressed gender stereotypes prevalent in Chinatown.

Work 

In 2002 Lehman College Art Gallery presented If the Shoe Fits.... Holland Cotter noted that when the artist first met her grandmother in 1980 she proudly displayed the three-inch-long shoes she wore on her bound feet. In 2009, Kuo created a series of video, animation and installation art works called Mythical Montage, which examined "illusion, feminine irony and transformations of Asian influences" and her Tang Ladies  were described as "statuesque, delicate and quiet on the canvas as they investigate anachronistic details" referencing the Chinese woman's desire to fit in, as well as the often negative connotation given to them by society, specifically in New York City. In 2013, Kuo commemorated Danny Chen, who committed suicide after harassment and hazing for being Asian-American. In 2014 she was featured in a solo show at Andre Zarre. Cultural influences from her travels in China, Japan, Taiwan and Hong Kong were documented in 2016 on WNYU radio. That same year, she submitted her Face Montage to the What is Feminist Art? collection at the Lawrence A. Fleischman Gallery, it consisted of various images of Chinatown bands and a portrait of Danny Chen. She has described her Art Deviation exhibition in 2020 as “work that has more surprise and mystery, that is more thought provoking, pleasing and enticing so that it's not just technique... You are trying to draw them into a conversation, to bring in something unusual, to make the viewer sense there is a tantalizing experience.” In 2022-2023, her hand printed photo works Contrapted Series Chinatown and Contrapted Series Quilt, Brooklyn (both 1983), which overlay photographs of New York neighbourhoods with colourful fragments, demonstrating how cultural memory is made from scattered debris, were shown at the Museum of Modern Art's Just Above Midtown (JAM) Gallery.

Kuo received scholarships and studied at International Center of Photography in New York City. Her work is in the collections of Brooklyn Museum of Art and New Museum in New York City. She has lectured at the New School, Newark Museum, Beijing University, Central Academy of Art, Beijing.

In 2020, she created a series of sculptures in relation to the coronavirus, honoring the lives of those lost with her "Tomb Clay Figures," which she said: "This global pandemic pinpoints how death is mentally difficult. My goal is to create art that can reinvent these emotions, while honoring people we have all admired."

Exhibitions

Solo 

2007: "Chanel Chinoiserie," Cheryl McGinnis Gallery (New York, NY)
2009: "Mythical Museum," with Lorin Roser, Gallery 456 (New York, NY)
2014: "New Works: Artquakes," Andre Zarre Gallery (New York, NY)
2020: "Art Deviation," Flushing Town Hall (Queens, New York)

Group 

 1978: Group show, Just Above Midtown Gallery, New York, NY
 1984: "ID: An Exhibition of Third World Woman Photographers," MoMA PS1 (New York, NY)
 1988: "TransAtlantic Traditions: Women Photographers from the USA and Puerto Rico,” Camerawork Gallery (London, UK), curated by Kellie Jones 
 1990: "Communycations: Public Mirror: Artists Against Racial Prejudice," MoMA PS1 (New York, NY)
 1991: "Visual Narratives," Wunsch Arts Center (Glen Cove, NY), curated by Thelma Golden
 1994: "Bad Girls (Part II)," New Museum of Contemporary Art New York (New York, NY)
 2002: "Constellation – Celebrating 25 Years," Center for Photography at Woodstock: CPW (Woodstock, NY)
 2003: "It's A Small World," China 2000 Fine Art (New York, NY)
 2005: "New York Eviction Blues," Asian American Arts Centre (New York, NY)
 2014: "Occupied Canvas," Andre Zarre Gallery (New York, NY)
 2019: "What is Feminist Art?," Archives of American Art, Smithsonian Institution (Washington, D.C.)
 2022: "Just Above Midtown: Changing Spaces," Museum of Modern Art (New York, NY)

Collections 

Brooklyn Museum
Library of Congress
New Museum

Grants and residencies 
 1982: Asian American Arts Centre – Artist residency
 1986: Artmatters – Grant
 1990: Museum of Chinese in America – Artist residency
 1993: Arts International – Travel grant to China1999: Light Work (Syracuse, NY) – Artist residency
 1999: Center for Photography at Woodstock (CPW), now known as Catskill Center for Photography – Artist residency
 2001, 2002: New York Foundation for the Arts (NYFA) – Artist grant
 2002: Travel Grant to Japan  to study Zen Painting

Publications 
 
  Catalog of an exhibition held at the Robert B. Menschel Photography Gallery, Syracuse, NY

References

Further reading 
 
 
 
 
 
 
 

Living people
American video artists
American women artists
American multimedia artists
University at Buffalo alumni
Artists from New York City
1952 births
Feminist artists
21st-century American women